The Potez 452 was a French flying boat designed and built by Potez in response to a French Navy specification for a shipboard reconnaissance machine for use on its battleships and cruisers.

Design
The design requirements included the ability for launch by a catapult or from the sea. In addition, the wings were required to fold to simplify storage aboard ship. It first flew in 1935, and after satisfactory flight trials, it began equipping French ships a year later. Only sixteen Potez 452s were built. The Spanish Navy also expressed interest, which resulted in Spain acquiring a manufacturing license. Spain built no aircraft.

Operational history
The Potez 452 was active as a reconnaissance aircraft during the early months of World War II. During that time there was no significant naval action in the Mediterranean where most of the French Navy was operating. After the French capitulation to Germany in June 1940, these aircraft continued to serve with their ships and as part of Vichy France's military, briefly engaged their former ally Great Britain. Other Potez 452s were deployed to French colonies in French Indochina, which included reconnaissance duty in the 1940–1941 Franco-Thai War between the Vichy French controlled colonies and Thailand and some remained in service until 1944, by which time the final survivors were retired. In 1937 a single Potez 452 had been supplied to the Imperial Japanese Navy Air Service for evaluation as the Potez HXP1.

Variants

Potez 450
Prototype flying-boat with a  Salmson 9Ab engine, one built
Potez 452
Production variant with a  Hispano-Suiza 9Qd engine, 48 built.
Potez 453
Floatplane fighter derived from the 452, powered by a  Hispano-Suiza 14Hbs. A single prototype was built, first flown on 24 September 1935.

Operators

French Navy

Specifications (Potez 452)

See also

References

Notes

Bibliography
Bousquet, Gérard. French Flying Boats of WW II. Sandomierz, Poland: Stratus, 2013 

1930s French military reconnaissance aircraft
Flying boats
045
Single-engined tractor aircraft
Parasol-wing aircraft
Aircraft first flown in 1935